Stanisław Odrowąż (1509-1545) was a Polish noble (szlachcic).

He married Katarzyna Górka in 1530 and Anna of Masovia from the Piast dynasty in February 1536. He had one child with Anna, Zofia Odrowąż.

He was castellan of Lwów since 1533, starost of Lwów since 1534, voivode of Podole Voivodship since 1535, voivode of Ruthenian Voivodship since 1542 and starost of Sambor.

1509 births
1545 deaths
Polish Roman Catholics
Ruthenian nobility
Stanislaw
16th-century Polish nobility